The 2007 FIVB Girls Youth Volleyball World Championship was held in Tijuana / Mexicali, Mexico from 31 July to 11 August 2009. 16 teams participated in the tournament.

Qualification process

Pools composition

First round
All times are Mexico Standard Time (UTC−06:00).

Pool A

|}

|}

Pool B

|}

|}

Pool C

|}

|}

Pool D

|}

|}

Second round

Pool E (1st–8th)

|}

|}

Pool F (1st–8th)

|}

|}

Pool G (9th–16th)

|}

|}

Pool H (9th–16th)

|}

|}

Final round

13th–16th bracket

|}

15th Placement Match

|}

13th Placement Match

|}

9th–12th bracket

|}

11th Placement Match

|}

9th Placement Match

|}

5th–8th bracket

|}

7th Placement Match

|}

5th Placement Match

|}

Championship bracket

Semifinals

|}

Bronze Medal match

|}

Final

|}

Final standing

Individual awards

Most Valuable Player

Best Scorer

Best Spiker

Best Blocker

Best Server

Best Digger

Best Setter

Best Receiver

References

See also
 2007 FIVB Volleyball Boys' U19 World Championship

World Championship
2007 in Thai sport
2007
2007
Tijuana
Mexicali